Lepidothrix is a genus of passerine birds in the manakin family Pipridae. Birds in the genus are predominantly found in South America, but one species, the velvety manakin, also ranges into Central America. The females of this genus have green plumage with yellow bellies, as do some of the males. The remaining males have black plumage with white or blue crowns. Some also have yellow bellies or blue rumps.

Taxonomy
The genus Lepidothrix was introduced by the French naturalist Charles Lucien Bonaparte in 1854. The type species was subsequently designated as the blue-capped manakin. The name Lepidothrix combines the Ancient Greek words λεπις lepis, λεπιδος lepidos "scale, flake" and θριξ thrix, τριχος trikhos "hair". A new genus name Neolepidothrix, was proposed in 2009 due to a suggestion that it was a junior homonym of the extinct silverfish Lepidotrix, however it was later shown that the original spelling of the silverfish genus was not same, so therefore the genera were not homonymous.

The genus contains nine species:

References

 
Bird genera
Taxa named by Charles Lucien Bonaparte
Taxonomy articles created by Polbot